Ainur Yesbergenova (born 11 February 1998) is a Kazakhstani taekwondo athlete.

She competed at the 2016 Summer Olympics in Rio de Janeiro, in the women's 49 kg.

References

External links
 
 

 

1998 births
Living people
Kazakhstani female taekwondo practitioners
Olympic taekwondo practitioners of Kazakhstan
Taekwondo practitioners at the 2016 Summer Olympics
Taekwondo practitioners at the 2018 Asian Games
Asian Games competitors for Kazakhstan
People from Kyzylorda
21st-century Kazakhstani women